Ryan Reef is an isolated reef lying off the north coast of South Georgia, 0.5 nautical miles (0.9 km) north of the east entrance point of Doris Bay. The reef appears on a chart based upon surveys by DI personnel in the period 1925–31, but it may have been charted earlier. It was named by the United Kingdom Antarctic Place-Names Committee (UK-APC), following a survey by the SGS, 1951–52, for Alfredo R.L. Ryan, president of the Compania Argentina de Pesca, which operated the whaling station at Grytviken, South Georgia.

References

 

Reefs of Antarctica